The Texas–Oklahoma League was a Minor League Baseball Class-D circuit that operated between  and . The league formed twice, the first began in 1911 and finished in 1914, while the second was active in 1921 and 1922. League franchises were based in Oklahoma and Texas.

Cities/Teams/Years

Standings & statistics

1911 to 1914
1911 Texas–Oklahoma Leagueschedule 1st half2nd half  
Gainesville disbanded June 14; Lawton disbanded June 16; Altus disbanded July 18. Playoff: Wichita Falls leading Cleburne 2 games to 1, when Wichita Falls refused to continue due to an ineligible player and non-payment of gate receipts for a game in Cleburne. Cleburne was declared champion. 
 

1912 Texas–Oklahoma Leagueschedule
McKinney and Greenville disbanded June 7. Playoffs: Wichita Falls was leading Ardmore 2 games to 1 when Ardmore disbanded August 1. The title was awarded to Wichita Falls.

 
1913 Texas–Oklahoma Leagueschedule
 Wichita Falls (33–46) moved to Hugo July 7. 
 
1914 Texas–Oklahoma League schedule

Hugo and Ardmore disbanded June 11;  Bonham and Sherman disbanded July 30. Playoff: Texarkana 3 games, Paris 1.

1921 & 1922 
1921 Texas–Oklahoma Leagueschedule
Graham (5-24) moved to Mineral Wells May 27, first home game May 30. Playoff: Ardmore 4 games, Paris 4; Ardmore refused to play at Paris. Paris was named champion.
 
1922 Texas–Oklahoma League schedule
Cleburne disbanded July 22; Bonham was dropped July 22. The season was shortened to August 6 with National Association permission due to a railroad strike.

Hall of Fame alumni 
Rogers Hornsby, 1914 Hugo Scouts; 1914 Denison Champions
Kid Nichols, 1914 Bonham Sliders

Championship teams
1911 Cleburne Railroaders 
1912 Ardmore Giants 
1913 Denison Blue Sox 
1914 Texarkana Tigers
1921 Paris Snappers 
1922 Paris Snappers

References

External links
Baseball Reference

Sources
Minor League Baseball Standings: All North American Leagues, through 1999 – Benjamin Barrett Sumner. Publisher: McFarland & Company, 2000. Format: Hardcover, 726pp. Language: English. 
Encyclopedia of Minor League Baseball: The Official Record of Minor League Baseball – Lloyd Johnson, Miles Wolff, Steve McDonald. Publisher: Baseball America, 1997. Format: Paperback, 672pp. Language: English. 

1911 establishments in Texas
1911 establishments in Oklahoma
1922 disestablishments in Texas
1922 disestablishments in Oklahoma
Defunct minor baseball leagues in the United States
Baseball leagues in Oklahoma
Baseball leagues in Texas
Sports leagues established in 1911
Sports leagues established in 1921
Sports leagues disestablished in 1914
Sports leagues disestablished in 1922